Procottus gurwicii, the dwarf sculpin, is a species of freshwater fish endemic to Lake Baikal in southern Siberia, Russia.  It was discovered in 1946 when a single male specimen was found in the coastal waters of the lake, at a depth of about 93 metres. The specimen measured a total length of 6.2 centimetres.

References

Dwarf sculpin
Taxa named by Dmitrii Nikolaevich Taliev
Fish described in 1946
Fish of Lake Baikal